Magendiran Chinnadurai (born 5 January 1984) is an Indian cricketer. He made his List A debut for Pondicherry in the 2018–19 Vijay Hazare Trophy on 2 October 2018.

References

External links
 

1984 births
Living people
Indian cricketers
Pondicherry cricketers
Place of birth missing (living people)